David Eisenbud (born 8 April 1947 in New York City) is an American mathematician.  He is a professor of mathematics at the University of California, Berkeley and former director of the then Mathematical Sciences Research Institute (MSRI), now known as Simons Laufer Mathematical Sciences Institute (SLMath). He served as Director of MSRI from 1997 to 2007, and then again from 2013 to 2022.

Biography
Eisenbud is the son of mathematical physicist Leonard Eisenbud, who was a student and collaborator of the renowned physicist Eugene Wigner. Eisenbud received his Ph.D. in 1970 from the University of Chicago, where he was a student of Saunders Mac Lane and, unofficially, James Christopher Robson.  He then taught at Brandeis University from 1970 to 1997, during which time he had visiting positions at Harvard University, Institut des Hautes Études Scientifiques (IHÉS), University of Bonn, and Centre national de la recherche scientifique (CNRS).  He joined the staff at MSRI in 1997, and took a position at Berkeley at the same time.

From 2003 to 2005 Eisenbud was President of the American Mathematical Society.

Eisenbud's mathematical interests include commutative and non-commutative algebra, algebraic geometry, topology, and computational methods in these fields.  He has written over 150 papers and books with over 60 co-authors.  Notable contributions include the theory of matrix factorizations for maximal Cohen–Macaulay modules over hypersurface rings, the Eisenbud–Goto conjecture on degrees of generators of syzygy modules, and the Buchsbaum–Eisenbud criterion for exactness of a complex. He also proposed the Eisenbud–Evans conjecture, which was later settled by the Indian mathematician Neithalath Mohan Kumar.

He has had 31 doctoral students, including Craig Huneke, Mircea Mustaţă, Irena Peeva, and Gregory G. Smith (winner of the Aisenstadt Prize in 2007).

Eisenbud's hobbies are juggling (he has written two papers on the mathematics of juggling) and music. He has appeared in Brady Haran's online video channel "Numberphile".

Eisenbud was elected Fellow of the American Academy of Arts and Sciences in 2006. He was awarded the Leroy P. Steele Prize in 2010. In 2012 he became a fellow of the American Mathematical Society.

Selected publications

Books

Articles

See also
 Eisenbud–Levine–Khimshiashvili signature formula

References

External links

Eisenbud's biographical page at MSRI

Algebraists
Algebraic geometers
University of Chicago alumni
University of California, Berkeley College of Letters and Science faculty
Brandeis University faculty
Harvard University staff
Mathematics popularizers
Presidents of the American Mathematical Society
Fellows of the American Mathematical Society
20th-century American mathematicians
21st-century American mathematicians
Mathematicians from New York (state)
1947 births
Living people